Csaba Zalka (born 11 March 1999) is a Slovak sprint canoeist.

He won a medal at the 2019 ICF Canoe Sprint World Championships.

References

External links

1999 births
Living people
ICF Canoe Sprint World Championships medalists in kayak
People from Šamorín
Sportspeople from the Trnava Region
Slovak male canoeists
Canoeists at the 2019 European Games
European Games medalists in canoeing
European Games bronze medalists for Slovakia